58 Aquilae is a single star located around 520 light years from the Sun in the equatorial constellation of Aquila, near Eta Aquilae. 58 Aquilae is its Flamsteed designation. It is visible to the naked eye as a dim, blue-white hued star with an apparent visual magnitude of 5.60.

This object has a stellar classification of B9 IV, matching a late B-type subgiant star. It has 5.6 times the radius of the Sun with a high rate of spin, showing a projected rotational velocity of 110 km/s. The star is radiating 117 times the luminosity of the Sun from its photosphere at an effective temperature of 7,946 K.

References

B-type subgiants
Aquila (constellation)
Durchmusterung objects
Aquilae, 58
188350
097980
7596